Big Wata is a 2018 Sierra Leone documentary that was directed by Gugi van der Velden and produced by  Floris Loeff.

Plot
The youth of a fishing community in Sierra Leone have discovered their new identity through surfing, but the elders in the community disapprove of what they set out to do but they have to fight all odds to make their dreams come true.

References

Sierra Leonean documentary films
2018 films